Cyprus competed at the 2001 Mediterranean Games held in Tunis, Tunisia.

Medals by sport

List of Medalists

References
 2001 Mediterranean Games Official Results

Nations at the 2001 Mediterranean Games
Cyprus at the Mediterranean Games
2001 in Cypriot sport